Tagge is a surname. Notable people with the surname include:

Jerry Tagge (born 1950), American football player
Jørn Ronnie Tagge (born 1969), Norwegian businessman and fraudster

See also
Tagge Webster (1910–1986), English cricketer
General Tagge, an Imperial general in Star Wars: Episode IV - A New Hope